Gracillariinae are a subfamily of moths which was described by Henry Tibbats Stainton in 1854.

The subfamilies of Gracillariidae differ by the adult moth resting posture. Most Gracillariinae rest with the front of the body steeply raised; Lithocolletinae and Phyllocnistinae rest with the body parallel to the surface; in Lithocolletinae often with the head lowered.

Genera
Gracillariidae phylogeny has been revised in 2017(Kawahara et al. 2017) and the Acrocercopinae subfamily is contains 25 genera (59 genera were affected to other subfamilies):

Africephala Vári, 1986
Apistoneura Vári, 1961
Aristaea Meyrick, 1907
Artifodina Kumata, 1985
Aspilapteryx Spuler, 1910
=Sabulopteryx Triberti, 1985
Callicercops Vári, 1961
Caloptilia Hübner, 1825
=Poeciloptilia Hübner, 1825
=Ornix Collar, 1832
=Ornix Treitschke, 1833
=Coriscium Zeler, 1839
=Calliptilia Agassiz, 1847
=Timodora Meyrick, 1886
=Antiolopha Meyrick, 1894
=Sphyrophora Vári, 1961
=Phylloptilia Kumata, 1982
=Rhadinoptilia Kumata, 1982
=Minyoptilia Kumata, 1982
=Cecidoptilia Kumata, 1982
Calybites Hübner, 1822
Cryptologa T. B. Fletcher, 1921
Cupedia Klimesch & Kumata, 1973
Dextellia Triberti, 1986
Ectropina Vári, 1961
Epicnistis Meyrick, 1906
Eucalybites Kumata, 1982
Euprophantis Meyrick, 1921
Eurytyla Meyrick, 1893
Euspilapteryx Stephens, 1835
Gracillaria Haworth, 1928
=Gracilaria Zeller, 1839
=Gracilaria Walsingham, 1907
=Xanthospilapteryx Spuler, 1910
Ketapangia Kumata, 1995
Macarostola Meyrick, 1907
Neurolipa Ely, 1918
Penica Walsingham, 1914
Polymitia Triberti, 1986
Synnympha Meyrick, 1915
Systoloneura Vári, 1961

Moved genera:

Genera moved to Acrocercopinae
Acrocercops Wallengren, 1881
Amblyptila Vári, 1961
Borboryctis Kumata & Kurokoo, 1988
Chilocampyla Busck, 1900
Chrysocercops Kumata & Kuroko, 1988
Corethrovalva Vári, 1961
Cryptolectica Vári, 1961
Dekeidoryxis Kumata, 1989
Deoptilia Kumata & Kuroko, 1988
Dialectica Walsingham, 1897
Eteoryctis Kumata & Kuroko, 1988
Eucosmophora Walsingham, 1897
Gibbovalva Kumata & Kuroko, 1988
Hypectopa Diakonoff, 1955
Lamprolectica Vári, 1961
Leucocercops Vári, 1961
Leucospilapteryx Spuler, 1910
Melanocercops Kumata & Kuroko, 1988
Metacercops Vári, 1961
Monocercops Kumata, 1989
Phodoryctis Kumata & Kuroko, 1988
Psydrocercops Kumata & Kuroko, 1988
Sauterina Kuznetzov, 1979
Schedocercops Vári, 1961
Spulerina Vári, 1961
Telamoptilia Kumata & Kuroko, 1988
Vihualpenia Mundaca, Parra & Vargas, 2013
Genera moved to Lithocolletinae
Leucanthiza Clemens, 1859
Genera moved to Marmarinae
Dendrorycter Kumata, 1978
Marmara Clemens, 1863
Genera moved to Ornixolinae
Apophthisis Braun, 1915
Conopobathra Vári, 1961
Conopomorpha Meyrick, 1885
Conopomorphina Vári, 1961
Cuphodes Meyrick, 1897
Cyphosticha Meyrick, 1907
Diphtheroptila Vári, 1961
Dysectopa Vári, 1961
Epicephala Meyrick, 1980
=Iraina Diakonoff, 1955
=Leiocephala Kuznetzov & Baryschnikova, 2001
Leurocephala D.R. Davis & McKay, 2011
Liocrobyla Meyrick, 1916
Micrurapteryx Spuler, 1910
Neurobathra Ely, 1918
Neurostrota Ely, 1918
Oligoneurina Vári, 1961
Ornixola Kuznetzov, 1979
Pareclectis Meyrick, 1937
Parectopa Clemens, 1860
Philodoria Walsingham, 1907
=Euphilodoria Zimmermann, 1978
Phrixosceles Meyrick, 1908
Pogonocephala Vári, 1961
Polydema Vári, 1961
Polysoma Vári, 1961
Semnocera Vári, 1961
Spanioptila Walsingham, 1897
Spinivalva Moreira & Vargas, 2013
Stomphastis Meyrick, 1912
Genera moved to Parornichinae
Callisto Stephens, 1834
=Annickia Gibeaux, 1990
Graphiocephala Vári, 1961
Parornix Spuler, 1910
=Alfaornix Kuznetzov, 1979
=Betaornix Kuznetzov, 1979
=Deltaornix Kuznetzov, 1979
=Gammaornix Kuznetzov, 1979
Pleiomorpha Vári, 1961

References

Davis, D.R, and Robinson, G.S. (1999). The Tineoidea and Gracillarioidea. In: Kristensen, N.P. (ed.), Lepidoptera, Moths and Butterflies, 1: Evolution, Systematics, and Biogeography. Handbuch der Zoologie 4 (35): 91-117. Walter de Gruyter. Berlin, New York.
 , 2009: Review of Spulerimx (Lepidoptera: Gracillariidae) from China, with description of three new species. Oriental Insects 43: 33-44.
 , 2011: Biology and systematics of the leafmining Gracillariidae of Brazilian Pepper Tree, Schinus terebinthifolus Raddi, with descriptions of a new genus and four new species. Journal of the Lepidopterists' Society 65 (2): 61-93.
 , 1981. The Leafmining Moths of the genus Cameraria associated with Fagaceae in California (Lepidoptera: Gracillariidae). Smithsonian Contributions to Zoology 333: 1-58. Full article: 
 , 2013: Four new species of Gracillariidae (Lepidoptera) from China and Japan, and description of the pupal morphology of the genera Corythoxestis, Eumetriochroa, Guttigera and Metriochroa. Zootaxa 3619 (2): 101-129. Preview and full article: 
 , 1995: SOME SPECIES OF THE SUBFAMILY LITHOCOLLETINAE [GRACILLARIIDAE, LEPIDOPTERA] COLLECTED IN THE PHILIPPINES. Insecta Matsumurana New Series 52: 105-131. Full article: .
 , 1995: KETAPANGIA, A NEW GENUS FOR MACAROSTOLA LEUCOCHORDA AND ACROCERCOPS REGULIFERA [GRACILLARIIDAE, LEPIDOPTERA]. Insecta Matsumurana 52: 133-148. Full article: .
 , 1998: JAPANESE SPECIES OF THE SUBFAMILY OECOPHYLLEMBIINAE RÉAL ET BALACHOWSKY (LEPIDOPTERA : GRACILLARIIDAE), WITH DESCRIPTIONS OF A NEW GENUS AND EIGHT NEW SPECIES. Insecta Matsumurana New Series 54: 77-131. Full article: .
 , 2001: Review of the Palaearctic genera of the family Gracillariidae (Lepidoptera) with description of a new subfamily Ornixolinae Kuznetzov et Baryshnikova, subfam. n. Entomological Review 81 (1): 26-46.
 , 2013: A new genus and species of leaf miner (Lepidoptera, Gracillariidae) for Chile associated to the native tree Lithraea caustica. Revista Brasileira de Entomologia 57 (2): 157-164. Full article: .
 , 2005, World Catalogue of Insects: Gracillariidae (Lepidoptera) volume 6: 502 pp.
 , 2005: A new genus and a new species of Oecophyllembiinae (Lepidoptera: Gracillariidae) from Chile. Neotropical Entomology 34 (2): 227-233. Abstract and full article: .
 2011: Zootaxa, 2892: 25–32. Preview

External links
Wikispecies

 
Moth subfamilies